is a streaming television series adaptation of the novel Spark by Naoki Matayoshi. It premiered worldwide on Netflix on June 2, 2016. The story follows an aspiring stand-up comedian Tokunaga (Kento Hayashi), who embarks on an apprenticeship with Kamiya (Kazuki Namioka), a seasoned manzai artist.

Cast 
 Kento Hayashi as Tokunaga
 Kazuki Namioka as Kamiya
 Mugi Kadowaki as Maki
 Masao Yoshii (Inoshita Yoshii) as Yamashita
 Hideaki Murata (Toro salmon) as Ōbayashi
 Nahana as Erika Nishida
 Sayaka Yamamoto as waitress
 Eri Tokunaga as Ayumi
 Maryjun Takahashi as Yurie
 Rina Takeda
 Shugo Oshinari as Sasamoto
 Kyūsaku Shimada
 Shōta Sometani as Ogata
 Tomorowo Taguchi as Hyuga
 Kaoru Kobayashi as Watanabe
 Hiro Honda as VIP guest

Reception 
David Cirone of J-Generation criticized the slow pacing of the first half of the series, but said "even with its rough edges, Hibana shines with the power of its two leads [Hayashi and Namioka]." Maggie Lee of Variety called the series "a profoundly reflective and achingly tender look at Japan's vibrant yet cutthroat comedy scene". Elissa Loi of Stuff complimented the show for "steering away from the usual predictable Japanese tropes".

Soundtrack

Theme song 
Okamoto's - "Brother"

Released June 1, 2016

Soundtrack album 
Netflix Original Drama Hibana -Spark- Soundtrack

Released February 26, 2017 (Yoshimoto Music Ltd.)

References

External links 
 

2016 Japanese television series debuts
2016 Japanese television series endings
Japanese-language Netflix original programming
Television shows based on Japanese novels

ja:火花 (小説)#ドラマ